Nuvsvåg is a village in Loppa Municipality in Troms og Finnmark county, Norway.  The village is located on the mainland, along the Nuvsfjorden.  This part of Loppa is a peninsula that has one road along the fjord, but it is only accessible by a ferry from the village of Øksfjord.

In 2015, there are 66 inhabitants in the village (Loppa municipality had 989 at that time). Nuvsvåg Chapel is located in this village.  Nuvsvåg's primary industry is fishing.

Name 
The name is from the Norwegian word nuv, meaning rounded hump or mountain, which is also the name of the rounded mountain Nuven at the mouth of the fjord. The word derives from the Old Norse word hnúfa, which either means hump, but it's also a byname alternately meaning "snub" or snub-nosed. The word "'hnufa' also refers to a bondmaid whose nose has been cut off for theft thrice repeated.

Nuvsvåg's old name was Nuvsfjord (Old Norse: Hnúfafjǫrðr) or sometimes spelled Nusfjord, and due to confusion with a village in Lofoten with the same name it was changed to Nuvsvåg.

History
For a time, there was a wolffish-farm here, but due to a lack of funding, it closed after a short time.

On 25 May 2012, the municipal politicians decided to close the public school in Nuvsvåg.  Then, in 2015, the one shop in Nuvsvåg closed.  In June 2015 another food store was scheduled to open in its place, according to Klassekampen.

Geography

About  to the south of Nuvsvåg is Finnmark county's tallest mountain, Loppatinden, and the large glacier Øksfjordjøkelen.  About  to the southwest of Nuvsvåg lies the mountain Svartfjellet and the glacier Svartfjelljøkelen.

Commerce
In 2015, one fishing boat was based out of this village. Another fishing boat became inoperable due to fire, that year.

References

Villages in Finnmark
Loppa
Populated places of Arctic Norway